Monte Zerbion (Italian) or Mont Dzerbion (French) (altitude 2,719 m) is a mountain of the Pennine Alps in Aosta Valley, Italy. It lies between the eastern Ayas Valley and the Valtournenche Valley to the west.

Description 
It is usually climbed from the Ayas side, starting from the village of Barmasc, from where it is a simple hike up to the summit. 

It is also a popular peak for ski mountaineering.

The view from the top includes the entire Monte Rosa group and the Matterhorn. A large statue of Mary, mother of Jesus lies on its summit.

References

Mountains of the Alps
Mountains of Aosta Valley